The FIBT World Championships 1986 took place in Königssee, West Germany for the second time, having hosted the event previously in 1979.

Two man bobsleigh

Four man bobsleigh

Medal table

References
2-Man bobsleigh World Champions
4-Man bobsleigh World Champions

1986
1986 in West German sport
1986 in bobsleigh
1986 in German sport
International sports competitions hosted by West Germany
Bobsleigh in Germany